Jonathan Paul Sunderland (born 2 November 1975 in Newcastle upon Tyne) is an English retired professional footballer. He played as a midfielder.

Sunderland began his career as a trainee with Blackpool, turning professional in July 1994. He made just three appearances for Blackpool, all as a substitute, and had a spell on loan with Northwich Victoria in October 1995, before leaving to join Scarborough on a free transfer in March 1996. He was released by Scarborough that December and joined Hartlepool United on non-contract terms, scoring on his debut on 21 December 1996 as Hartlepool won 2–1 at home to Lincoln City, having only been on the pitch for eight minutes (as a substitute for Glen Davies).

He was released by Hartlepool at the end of the season and in August 1997 joined Gateshead. He later played for Ashington before joining Queen of the South on 19 June 2000. He played nearly 50 games before leaving in January 2002, joining Whitley Bay. In May 2002 he was part of the Bay side that won the FA Vase, although was sent-off for violent conduct as Bay won 1–0 against Tiptree United at Villa Park.

He left Bay to return to Ashington in August 2004, and helped the Colliers to promotion to the Northern League First Division in 2004.

He joined Bedlington Terriers in July 2008.

References

External links
Sunderland's profile at Soccerbase

1975 births
Living people
English footballers
Footballers from Newcastle upon Tyne
Blackpool F.C. players
Northwich Victoria F.C. players
Scarborough F.C. players
Hartlepool United F.C. players
Gateshead F.C. players
Ashington A.F.C. players
Queen of the South F.C. players
Whitley Bay F.C. players
Bedlington Terriers F.C. players
Association football midfielders